Strömsö is a Finnish television program (in  Swedish) which premiered in 2002 on FST and TV1, hosted by Matias Jungar and Susanna Ström-Wilkinson. The show concentrates on various household subjects, such as cooking and gardening. Its fifth season started on January 29, 2006. Since the beginning of 2007 the show is hosted by Lee Esselström and Jocke Lax.

The show is made at Strömsö (from which the show gets its name), a villa north of the city of Vaasa. The villa was built in the 1860s and served as the summer residence for a merchant family from Vaasa for about 100 years.

Staff 
 Lee Esselström, host, expert on hobbies
 Jocke Lax, host
 Paul Svensson, cooking expert
 Susanna Ström-Wilkinson, editor (former host) 
 Matias Jungar, editor (former host)
 Michael Björklund, cooking expert
 Jim Björni, workshop expert
 Catharina Borg-Wilén, gardening expert
 Wivan Fagerudd, gardening reporter
 Camilla Forsén, art expert
 Elisabeth Morney, feature editor
 Owe Salmela, florist
 Noora Vuorimaa, wine expert
 Johan Ångerman, carpenter
 Anna Svensson, expert on chicken vilog
 Lena Gillberg, gardening expert

External links 
 Official website  

Finland-Swedish television shows
Finnish television shows
2000s Finnish television series
2002 Finnish television series debuts
Yle original programming